Pierre Arbaut (16 May 1876 – 22 November 1948) was a French sailor. He competed in the 8 Metre event at the 1936 Summer Olympics.

References

External links
 

1876 births
1948 deaths
French male sailors (sport)
Olympic sailors of France
Sailors at the 1936 Summer Olympics – 8 Metre
People from Arcachon
Sportspeople from Gironde
20th-century French people